Finn Patrick King Delany (born 12 August 1995) is a New Zealand professional basketball player for Telekom Baskets Bonn of the German Basketball Bundesliga and the Basketball Champions League. He played college basketball for the Southwest Baptist Bearcats.

Professional career

Telekom Baskets Bonn (2022-present) 
On 12 July 2022, Delany signed with Telekom Baskets Bonn of the German Basketball Bundesliga and the Basketball Champions League.

New Zealand Breakers (2015-2022) 
Finn Delany has played for the New Zealand Breakers of the Australian NBL since 2015. In 2021 he averaged 16.2 points, 6.8 rebounds and 2.2 assists per game while shooting 46% from the floor and was consequently named to the All-NBL Second Team.

NBA Summer League (2019) 
In July 2019, Delany joined the Dallas Mavericks for the 2019 NBA Summer League. He averaged 6.3 points, 2 rebounds and 1.3 assists in 10 minutes per game.

KK FMP Belgrade (2019) 
In February 2019, Delany signed a contract with Serbian team KK FMP Belgrade for the rest of the 2018–19 season. His best showing for the club came against EuroLeague team KK Crvena Zvezda on 4 May 2019 when he had 18 points, 4 rebounds and 3 assists on 89% field goal shooting.

Nelson Giants (2013-2018) 
Finn Delany first played for his hometown Nelson Giants in the 2013 New Zealand NBL season when he was still at high school. He continued playing for the team until 2018 when he averaged 19.9 points, 7.7 rebounds and 2.5 assists on 57% field goal shooting and was named the league's best forward, the leagues best local forward/centre and to the All-Star Five.

National team career
Delany was a member of the New Zealand national team that won 4th place at the 2017 FIBA Asia Cup in Beirut, Lebanon. Over six tournament games, he averaged 12.7 points, 7.0 rebounds and 0.8 assists per game. He was a Tall Blacks member who won the bronze medal at the 2018 Commonwealth Games.

In November 2017, 2018, and February 2019, Delany represented the Tall Blacks during the 2019 FIBA Basketball World Cup qualifiers. Over nine qualifiers games, he averaged 7.2 points, 3.8 rebounds and 1.1 assists per game.

See also 
 List of foreign basketball players in Serbia

References

External links
Player Profile at realgm.com

1995 births
Living people
2019 FIBA Basketball World Cup players
Basketball League of Serbia players
Basketball players at the 2018 Commonwealth Games
Commonwealth Games bronze medallists for New Zealand
Commonwealth Games medallists in basketball
KK FMP players
Nelson Giants players
New Zealand Breakers players
New Zealand expatriate basketball people in Serbia
New Zealand expatriate basketball people in the United States
New Zealand men's basketball players
People educated at Nelson College
Power forwards (basketball)
Small forwards
Southwest Baptist Bearcats men's basketball players
Sportspeople from Nelson, New Zealand
Telekom Baskets Bonn players
Medallists at the 2018 Commonwealth Games